Schizothorax meridionalis is a species of ray-finned fish in the genus Schizothorax. It occurs in the Longchuan River and Daying River drainages in Yunnan, tributaries of the Irrawaddy River.

References 

Schizothorax
Fish described in 1964